The 2008 New York Yankees season was the 106th season for the New York Yankees franchise. The Yankees hosted the 2008 All-Star Game at Yankee Stadium on Tuesday July 15, 2008. It was the 83rd and last season at the original Yankee Stadium prior to the team's move to a new ballpark (also called "Yankee Stadium") just north of the current stadium. It also marked the first season since 1993 that the Yankees failed to make it to the playoffs (excepting the 1994 season, when a players' strike canceled the postseason, though the Yankees had the best record in the American League that year). Also, it would also be the first under a new team skipper, former team catcher Joe Girardi, who assumed the managerial role in the offseason.

Offseason

The Yankees' 2007/2008 offseason began in a tumultuous manner, with uncertainty as to the status of manager Joe Torre and team stalwarts Andy Pettitte, Jorge Posada, Mariano Rivera, and Alex Rodriguez, all of whom were free agents. While Torre departed after 12 years as the team's manager for the Los Angeles Dodgers, all four free agents returned to play for the Yankees in 2008, providing stability and continuity for new manager Joe Girardi.

Roster changes
Manager Joe Torre left for the Los Angeles Dodgers after the 2007 season. After conducting interviews with Don Mattingly, Tony Peña and Joe Girardi, Girardi was signed to be the new Yankees Manager. This prompted Mattingly to leave the team as well and follow Torre to the Dodgers.

On November 29, the Yankees re-signed catcher Jorge Posada to a four-year contract for $52,400,000. Posada will be earning $13,100,000 per season which is the highest average salary ever for a catcher.

On December 3, the Yankees re-signed backup catcher José Molina to a 2-year, $4 million contract.

On December 4, the Yankees shipped minor league pitcher and part-time MLB starter Tyler Clippard to the Washington Nationals for reliever Jonathan Albaladejo.

On December 9, the Yankees agreed to a contract with relief pitcher LaTroy Hawkins for 1 year, $3.75 million.

On December 12, the Yankees re-signed pitcher Andy Pettitte to a 1-year, $16 million contract.

Alex Rodriguez opted out of his contract in the middle of Game 4 of the 2007 World Series. The Yankees initially stated that they would not negotiate with Rodriguez once he opted out but changed course once Rodriguez announced his desire to return to pinstripes after issuing an apology for the public and the Yankees misunderstanding his desire to stay with the team. On December 13, 2007, Rodriguez and the Yankees officially agreed to a 10-year, $275 million contract that would rise to above $300 million if certain performance milestones were reached.
 
On December 17, the Yankees re-signed closer Mariano Rivera. Despite his original plan to hold out for a fourth year, Rivera agreed to a three-year contract offer worth $45 million, making him the highest-paid closer in baseball history.

Relief pitcher Luis Vizcaíno turned down an offer of salary arbitration and signed a multi-year deal with the Colorado Rockies on December 21. 1B Andy Phillips departed for the Cincinnati Reds, and Doug Mientkiewicz departed for the Pittsburgh Pirates. Roger Clemens remained a free agent and did not return to the Yankees in 2008. That would be the end of Clemens' MLB career. On March 10, 2008 the team signed actor/comedian Billy Crystal to a one-day contract just before his 60th birthday.

Regular season

April
The Yankees started opening day one day late at Yankee Stadium against the Toronto Blue Jays after a rainout. The Yankees took 2 of 3 games in the series. After that, they faced a new look Rays team. They lost the first two by the scores of 13-4 and 6-3, but would rebound and split the series 2 games apiece. Following the series, the Yankees had a grueling road trip in which they played 18 of their next 20 games on the road. During this stretch, rookies Phil Hughes and Ian Kennedy struggled mightily and went winless the entire first month. After a rib injury to Hughes, Kennedy was reassigned to the minor league AAA affiliate Scranton/Wilkes-Barre as the Yankees called up Darrell Rasner. Fortunately, Rasner went 3-1 with a 1.80 ERA in his first four starts.

Both shortstop Derek Jeter and third baseman Alex Rodriguez had suffered minor quadriceps injuries at different times. Catcher Jorge Posada was also placed on the disabled list for the first time in his career after a slight tear in his rotator cuff and backup infielder Wilson Betemit missed several games due to conjunctivitis.

May
Their struggles continued in May, as they only had one series win through the 20th and that was a 3-game sweep against the Mariners on May 2–4 at the Stadium. They would lose 3 of 4 against the Rays in St. Petersburg and were swept in 2 games by the Mets in the Subway Series. In that series, there was a controversial call where Carlos Delgado appeared to hit a foul ball by the left field foul pole, when a replay would later show that the ball was actually a home run. The Mets would go on to win 11-2. The game on the 16th was postponed because of rain. The Yankees would end the month winning 8 of their last 10 games, escaping the AL East cellar and getting back to over .500.

June
The Yankees lost three in a row through the first three days of June, dropping the final 2 games of the four-game set against the Twins at the Hubert H. Humphrey Metrodome, then were blitzed 9-3 by the Jays on Joba Chamberlain's first career start in the majors. The Yankees, however, won the next 2 against them including a wild comeback on June 5 that ended in a two-run, pinch hit homer into the upper deck by Jason Giambi after trailing 7-2 in the 6th inning. Following the series, Yankees split a 4-game weekend series with the Royals and took 2 out of 3 from the A's highlighted by Hideki Matsui celebrating his 34th birthday with a Grand Slam off of Joe Blanton. The Yankees would then sweep the Astros and were 4 games over .500 for the first time this season, but Chien-Ming Wang hurt his leg rounding the bases in a 13-0 win. He was out for the rest of the season. The Yankees would then sweep the Padres at home to win 7 straight for the first time this season. The streak came to a halt on June 20, when they lost to Edinson Vólquez and the Reds 4-2 on the Reds' first visit to Yankee Stadium since 1976, the first season of the renovated Yankee Stadium. They would follow with a lopsided 6-0 loss in which they left 12 runners on base despite Dan Giese's great outing, but salvage the final game with a 4-1 win. The Yankees traveled to PNC Park for the first time ever when they faced the Pirates from June 24–25 before returning to New York to play a double header with their cross-town rival Mets. In game one, the Yankees were outmatched 15-6, but rebounded in the nightcap game two, with a 9-0 shutout.

July
After dropping the first 2 games of a 3-game series to the Texas Rangers, the Yankees salvaged the final game 18-7 before losing the first two of a four-game series to the Red Sox 7-0 and 6-4. With Mike Mussina on the hill for game 3, they would rebound behind his 6 shutout innings to barely win 2-1 and then earn a split when rookie Brett Gardner hit a game-winning single in the bottom of the 10th inning for a 5-4 victory. In an important 2-game series against the Rays, they would win the first game 5-0 behind Andy Pettitte's stellar pitching performance and then complete the sweep on Bobby Abreu's game-winning double. The Yankees would go to Pittsburgh to play a make-up interleague game against the Pirates and lose 4-2. Next, they traveled to Toronto to play three against the Blue Jays. They would be shut out by Roy Halladay in the opener, getting only two hits but then they rebounded and won their next game 9-4 behind home runs by Derek Jeter and Alex Rodriguez. It was their 50th win of the season. After the game, the Yankees learned that former broadcaster Bobby Murcer died of cancer. After losing 4-1 to the Blue Jays on Sunday, the Yankees head into the All-Star break 6 games behind the Red Sox in the AL East and 5½ games behind the Rays in the Wild Card race. After the break, Yankees won 8 in a row including back to back sweeps of the Twins and A's, extending their winning streak to 10 games at home. After defeating the Boston Red Sox 1-0 in Joba Chamberlain's first career start at Fenway Park, the Yankees acquired Pittsburgh Pirates corner outfielder Xavier Nady and left-handed reliever Dámaso Marte for four minor league prospects. The Yankees then traded Kyle Farnsworth to the Detroit Tigers for catcher Iván Rodríguez.

August
The Yankees started August by losing 1-0 to the Angels when Mariano Rivera gave up a run in the 9th inning. The Yankees rebounded to take the next two, including an 8-2 win on Old Timers Day and a 14-9 come-from-behind victory on Sunday. The Yankees embarked on a key 10-game road trip with four against the Texas Rangers. In the opener, Joba Chamberlain was injured before the bullpen surrendered a walk-off grand slam to Marlon Byrd. The second game saw the Yankees fall short despite a grand slam of their own before rebounding to win the next two for the split. They were then swept in Anaheim, highlighted by an 8th inning 8-run meltdown on Saturday and Mariano Rivera allowing a walk off hit the next day. After losing two out of three to the Minnesota Twins, the Yankees were written off as contenders. Returning home, they dropped the opener to the Kansas City Royals but rebounded to win the next day in the 12th inning when Brett Gardner drove in the winning run. They took the series with a 15-6 romp the next day. The Yankees went back on the road for six games and lost two of three in Toronto. They did rebound to sweep the Baltimore Orioles, but the struggles continued at home vs Boston as they dropped the first 2 games, 7-3, and 11-3, respectively. A-Rod was heavily booed in game 1, as he was 0 for 5 and grounded into 2 double plays with one being in a bases-loaded situation. He also struck out to end the game. The Yankees would salvage the series finale with a score of 3-2 thanks to pinch-hitter Jason Giambi hitting a two-run homer in the 7th, and then a walk-off single in the bottom of the 9th.

September
The Yanks started off the last month of the regular season on a good note by beating the Tigers 13-9 in a makeup game that was postponed earlier in the season. They continued to keep fans' hopes high by thrashing the AL East leading Rays 7-2 and 8-4 in the first two games of a 3-game series in Tampa. They dropped the third game of the series 7-5. The following day in Seattle, Wilson Betemit's eighth-inning RBI double ended Brandon Morrow's no-hit bid, but New York still lost the game 3-1.

The final regular season game at Yankee Stadium was played on September 21, 2008 against the Baltimore Orioles, who are based in the city from which both the Yankees and their great star Babe Ruth originated. Fielding Derek Jeter as their captain, Andy Pettitte as the starting pitcher, and led by home runs from Johnny Damon and José Molina, the Yankees won 7–3. Molina's home run, a two-run shot hit to left-center field with one out in the bottom of the 4th inning, turned out to be the final home run in Stadium history. The final run was scored by Yankee pinch-runner Brett Gardner in the bottom of the 7th inning. Mariano Rivera pitched the top of the 9th inning, and the final batter was Baltimore's Brian Roberts, who hit a ground-ball out to Yankee first baseman Cody Ransom, closing out 83 years of baseball history. After the game, Derek Jeter addressed the crowd, thanking them for their support over the years, and urging them to "take the memories of this field, add them to the new memories that will come at the new Yankee Stadium and continue to pass them on from generation to generation." The Yankees players then circled the field and saluted the fans, to the sound of "New York, New York". Guest commentators for the game on ESPN included Yankee legends Reggie Jackson, Whitey Ford and Yogi Berra, as well as local YES Network announcer Michael Kay.

Line score from final game at Yankee Stadium

The Yankees were officially eliminated from the playoffs on September 23 with a Red Sox win over the Indians, making them the last team to miss out in the Division Series era and it was the first time since 1993 they missed the postseason (in 1994, the Yankees had the best record in the American League, but the season came to early halt as a result of the longest work stoppage in sports history up to that point.

On September 28, Mike Mussina won 20 games for the first time in his career, the oldest pitcher in major league history to win 20 games for the first time in his career. The record was previously held by Jamie Moyer, as he won 20 as a 38-year-old. This capped a remarkable comeback season for Mussina, who came back to win 20 games after a 5.15 ERA in 2007. He was one of the few bright spots of the Yankees 2008 season.

Season standings

Record vs. Opponents

Roster

Game log

|- align="center" bgcolor="#bbbbbb"
| — || March 31 || Blue Jays || colspan=6|Postponed (rain) Rescheduled for April 1
|-

|- align="center" bgcolor="bbffbb"
| 1 || April 1 || Blue Jays || 3–2 || Wang (1–0) || Halladay (0–1) || Rivera (1) || 55,112 || 1–0
|- align="center" bgcolor="ffbbbb"
| 2 || April 2 || Blue Jays || 5–2 || Burnett (1–0) || Mussina (0–1) || Accardo (1) || 48,544 || 1–1
|- align="center" bgcolor="bbffbb"
| 3 || April 3 || Blue Jays || 3–2 || Chamberlain (1–0) || Wolfe (0–1) || Rivera (2) || 47,785 || 2–1
|- align="center" bgcolor="ffbbbb"
| 4 || April 4 || Rays || 13–4 || Sonnanstine (1–0) || Kennedy (0–1) || || 49,255 || 2–2
|- align="center" bgcolor="ffbbbb"
| 5 || April 5 || Rays || 6–3 || Jackson (1–0) || Pettitte (0–1)|| Percival (1) || 52,247 || 2–3
|- align="center" bgcolor="bbffbb"
| 6 || April 6 || Rays || 2–0 || Wang (2–0) || Shields (1–1) ||Rivera (3) || 51,279 || 3–3
|- align="center" bgcolor="bbffbb"
| 7 || April 7 || Rays || 6–1 || Mussina (1–1) || Hammel (0–1) || || 41,302 || 4–3
|- align="center" bgcolor="ffbbbb"
| 8 || April 8 || @ Royals || 5–2 || Bannister (2–0) || Hughes (0–1) || Soria (4) || 37,296 || 4–4
|- align="center" bgcolor="ffbbbb"
| 9 || April 9 || @ Royals || 4–0 ||Greinke (2–0) ||Farnsworth (0–1) || Gobble (1)|| 19,007 || 4–5
|- align="center" bgcolor="bbffbb"
| 10 || April 10 || @ Royals || 6–1 || Pettitte (1–1) || Bale (0–2) || || 16,143 || 5–5
|- align="center" bgcolor="bbffbb"
| 11 || April 11 || @ Red Sox || 4–1 || Wang (3–0) || Timlin (0–1) || || 37,624 || 6–5
|- align="center" bgcolor="ffbbbb"
| 12 || April 12 || @ Red Sox || 4–3 || Beckett (1–1) || Mussina (1–2) || Papelbon (4) || 37,461 || 6–6
|- align="center" bgcolor="ffbbbb"
| 13 || April 13 || @ Red Sox || 8–5 || Matsuzaka (3–0) || Hughes (0–2) || || 37,876 || 6–7
|- align="center" bgcolor="bbffbb"
| 14 || April 14 || @ Rays || 8–7 || Bruney (1–0) || Reyes (1–2) || Rivera (4) || 18,872 || 7–7
|- align="center" bgcolor="bbffbb"
| 15 || April 15 || @ Rays || 5–3 || Pettitte (2–1) || Jackson (2–1) || Rivera (5) || 20,923 || 8–7
|- align="center" bgcolor="bbffbb"
| 16 || April 16 || Red Sox || 15–9 || Hawkins (1–0) || Tavárez (0–1) || Bruney (1) || 54,667 || 9–7
|- align="center" bgcolor="ffbbbb"
| 17 || April 17 || Red Sox || 7–5 || Beckett (2–1) || Mussina (1–3) || || 55,088 || 9–8
|- align="center" bgcolor="ffbbbb"
| 18 || April 18 || @ Orioles || 8–2 || Cabrera (1–0) || Hughes (0–3) || || 40,653 || 9–9
|- align="center" bgcolor="ffbbbb"
| 19 || April 19 || @ Orioles || 6–0 || Burres (2–1) || Kennedy (0–2) || Johnson (1) || 41,776 || 9–10
|- align="center" bgcolor="bbffbb"
| 20 || April 20 || @ Orioles || 7–1 || Pettitte (3–1) || Trachsel (1–3) || || 37,501 || 10–10
|- align="center" bgcolor="bbffbb"
| 21 || April 22 || @ White Sox || 9–5 || Wang (4–0) || Contreras (1–2) || || 25,012 || 11–10
|- align="center" bgcolor="bbffbb"
| 22 || April 23 || @ White Sox || 6–4 || Mussina (2–3) || Vázquez (3–2) || Rivera (6) || 27,751 || 12–10
|- align="center" bgcolor="ffbbbb"
| 23 || April 24 || @ White Sox || 7–6 || Jenks (1–0) || Chamberlain (1–1) || || 27,243 || 12–11
|- align="center" bgcolor="ffbbbb"
| 24 || April 25 || @ Indians || 6–4 || Byrd (1–2) || Pettitte (3–2) || Betancourt (2) || 31,467 || 12–12
|- align="center" bgcolor="ffbbbb"
| 25 || April 26 || @ Indians || 4–3 || Kobayashi (1–0) || Ohlendorf (0–1) || || 35,765 || 12–13
|- align="center" bgcolor="bbffbb"
| 26 || April 27 || @ Indians || 1–0 || Wang (5–0) || Sabathia (1–4) || Rivera (7) || 31,598 || 13–13
|- align="center" bgcolor="bbffbb"
| 27 || April 28 || @ Indians || 5–2 ||Mussina (3–3)|| Laffey (0–1) || Rivera (8) || 20,689 || 14–13
|- align="center" bgcolor="ffbbbb"
| 28 || April 29 || Tigers || 6–4 || Rogers (2–3) || Hughes (0–4) || Jones (5) || 49,194 || 14–14
|- align="center" bgcolor="ffbbbb"
| 29 || April 30 || Tigers || 6–2 || Bonderman (2–2) || Pettitte (3–3) || || 49,513 || 14–15
|-

|- align="center" bgcolor="ffbbbb"
| 30 || May 1 || Tigers || 8–4 || Robertson (1–3) || Albaladejo (0–1) || || 50,993 || 14–16
|- align="center" bgcolor="bbffbb"
| 31 || May 2 || Mariners || 5–1 || Wang (6–0) || Bédard (2–1) || || 52,199 || 15–16
|- align="center" bgcolor="bbffbb"
| 32 || May 3 || Mariners || 6–1 || Mussina (4–3) || Hernández (2–2) || || 52,810 || 16–16
|- align="center" bgcolor="bbffbb"
| 33 || May 4 || Mariners || 8–2 || Rasner (1–0) || Silva (3–1) || || 53,542 || 17–16
|- align="center" bgcolor="ffbbbb"
| 34 || May 6 || Indians || 5–3 || Pérez (1–1) || Chamberlain (1–2) || Betancourt (3) || 50,713 || 17–17
|- align="center" bgcolor="ffbbbb"
| 35 || May 7 || Indians || 3–0 || Lee (6–0) || Wang (6–1) || Betancourt (4) || 50,199 || 17–18
|- align="center" bgcolor="bbffbb"
| 36 || May 8 || Indians || 6–3 || Mussina (5–3) || Byrd (1–3) || Rivera (9) || 53,227 || 18–18
|- align="center" bgcolor="ffbbbb"
| 37 || May 9 || @ Tigers || 6–5 || Rogers (3–3) || Igawa (0–1) || || 44,062 || 18–19
|- align="center" bgcolor="bbffbb"
| 38 || May 10 || @ Tigers || 5–2 || Rasner (2-0) || Bonderman (2–4) || Rivera (10) || 44,580 || 19–19
|- align="center" bgcolor="bbbbbb"
| — || May 11 || @ Tigers || colspan=6|Postponed (rain) Rescheduled for September 1 
|- align="center" bgcolor="ffbbbb"
| 39 || May 12 || @ Rays || 7–1 || Garza (2–1) || Pettitte (3–4) || || 13,932 || 19–20
|- align="center" bgcolor="ffbbbb"
| 40 || May 13 || @ Rays || 2–1 (11) || Howell (3–0) || Rivera (0–1) || || 16,558 || 19–21
|- align="center" bgcolor="bbffbb"
| 41 || May 14 || @ Rays || 2–1 || Mussina (6–3) || Shields (4–3) || Rivera (11) || 20,936 || 20–21
|- align="center" bgcolor="ffbbbb"
| 42 || May 15 || @ Rays || 5–2 || Kazmir (2–1) || Kennedy (0–3) || Percival (10) || 19,976 || 20–22
|- align="center" bgcolor="bbbbbb"
| — || May 16 || Mets || colspan=6|Postponed (rain) Rescheduled for June 27
|- align="center" bgcolor="ffbbbb"
| 43 || May 17 || Mets || 7–4 || Santana (5–2) || Pettitte (3–5) || Wagner (9) || 55,093 || 20–23
|- align="center" bgcolor="ffbbbb"
| 44 || May 18 || Mets || 11–2 || Pérez (4–3) || Wang (6–2) || || 55,012 || 20–24
|- align="center" bgcolor="ffbbbb"
| 45 || May 20 || Orioles || 12–2 || Cabrera (5–1) || Mussina (6–4) || || 51,617 || 20–25
|- align="center" bgcolor="bbffbb"
| 46 || May 21 || Orioles || 8–0 || Rasner (3–0) || Olson (3–1) || || 50,682 || 21–25
|- align="center" bgcolor="bbffbb"
| 47 || May 22 || Orioles || 2–1 || Rivera (1–1) || Johnson (0–2) || || 49,452 || 22–25
|- align="center" bgcolor="bbffbb"
| 48 || May 23 || Mariners || 13–2 || Pettitte (4–5) || Bédard (3–3) || || 52,005 || 23–25
|- align="center" bgcolor="bbffbb"
| 49 || May 24 || Mariners || 12–6 || Mussina (7–4) || Silva (3–4) || || 53,512 || 24–25
|- align="center" bgcolor="bbffbb"
| 50 || May 25 || Mariners || 6–5 || Ramírez (1–0) || Putz (1–2) || Rivera (12) || 54,269 || 25–25
|- align="center" bgcolor="ffbbbb"
| 51 || May 26 || @ Orioles || 6–1 || Olson (4–1) || Rasner (3–1) || || 34,928 || 25–26
|- align="center" bgcolor="ffbbbb"
| 52 || May 27 || @ Orioles || 10–9 (11) || Albers (3–1) || Hawkins (1–1) || || 24,030 || 25–27
|- align="center" bgcolor="bbffbb"
| 53 || May 28 || @ Orioles || 4–2 || Pettitte (5–5)|| Guthrie (2–6) || Rivera (13) || 24,791 || 26–27
|- align="center" bgcolor="bbffbb"
| 54 || May 30 || @ Twins || 6–5 || Mussina  (8–4) || Perkins (2–2) ||Rivera (14) || 30,188 || 27–27
|- align="center" bgcolor="bbffbb"
| 55 || May 31 || @ Twins || 7–6 (12) || Ohlendorf (1–1) || Rincón (2–2) || Rivera (15) || 36,441 || 28–27
|-

|- align="center" bgcolor="ffbbbb"
| 56 || June 1 || @ Twins || 5–1 || Bass (2–1)|| Rasner (3–2) || || 27,479 || 28–28
|- align="center" bgcolor="ffbbbb"
| 57 || June 2 || @ Twins || 6–5 || Gurrier (3–1) || Farnsworth (0–2) || Nathan (15) || 20,168 || 28–29
|- align="center" bgcolor="ffbbbb"
| 58 || June 3 || Blue Jays || 9–3 || Halladay (7–5) || Giese (0–1) || || 53,629 || 28–30
|- align="center" bgcolor="bbffbb"
| 59 || June 4 || Blue Jays || 5–1 || Mussina (9–4) || Litsch (7–2)|| || 51,151 || 29–30
|- align="center" bgcolor="bbffbb"
| 60 || June 5 || Blue Jays || 9–8 || Farnsworth (1–2) || Ryan (1–2) || || 53,571 || 30–30
|- align="center" bgcolor="ffbbbb"
| 61 || June 6 || Royals || 2–1 || Kyle Davies (2–0) || Rasner (3–3) || Soria (13) || 52,187 || 30–31
|- align="center" bgcolor="bbffbb"
| 62 || June 7 || Royals || 12–11 || Rivera (2–1) || Soria (0–1)|| || 53,611 || 31–31
|- align="center" bgcolor="bbffbb"
| 63 || June 8 || Royals || 6–3 || Giese (1–1) || Greinke (5–4) || Rivera (16) || 54,213 || 32–31
|- align="center" bgcolor="ffbbbb"
| 64 || June 9 || Royals || 3–2 || Yabuta (1–0) || Rivera (2–2) || Soria (14) || 53,633 || 32–32
|- align="center" bgcolor="bbffbb"
| 65 || June 10 || @ Athletics || 3–1 || Wang (7–2) || Eveland (4–5) || Rivera (17) || 26,402 || 33–32
|- align="center" bgcolor="ffbbbb"
| 66 || June 11 || @ Athletics || 8–4 || Duchscherer (6–4) || Rasner (3–4) || || 27,292 || 33–33
|- align="center" bgcolor="bbffbb"
| 67 || June 12 || @ Athletics || 4-1 || Pettitte (6-5) || Blanton (3-9) || Rivera (18) || 28,658 || 34-33
|- align="center" bgcolor="bbffbb"
| 68 || June 13 || @ Astros || 2-1 || Veras (1-0) || Brocail (2-1) || Farnsworth (1) || 43,095 || 35-33
|- align="center" bgcolor="bbffbb"
| 69 || June 14 || @ Astros || 8–4 || Mussina (10–4) || Rodríguez (2–3) || || 43,409 || 36–33
|- align="center" bgcolor="bbffbb"
| 70 || June 15 || @ Astros || 13–0 || Wang (8–2) || Oswalt (5–7) || || 43,165 || 37–33
|- align="center" bgcolor="bbffbb"
| 71 || June 17 || Padres || 8–0 || Pettitte (7–5) || Wolf (5–5) || || 52,306 || 38–33
|- align="center" bgcolor="bbffbb"
| 72 || June 18 || Padres || 8–5 || Rasner (4–4) || Peavy (5–4) || Rivera (19) || 52,628 || 39–33 
|- align="center" bgcolor="bbffbb"
| 73 || June 19 || Padres || 2–1 || Veras (2–0) || Banks (2–1) || Rivera (20) || 54,362 || 40–33
|- align="center" bgcolor="ffbbbb"
| 74 || June 20 || Reds || 4–2 || Vólquez (10–2) || Mussina (10–5) || Cordero (14) || 53,421 || 40–34 
|- align="center" bgcolor="ffbbbb"
| 75 || June 21 || Reds || 6–0 || Bray (2–0) || Giese (1–2) || || 54,509 || 40–35
|- align="center" bgcolor="bbffbb"
| 76 || June 22 || Reds || 4–1 || Pettitte (8–5) || Cueto (5–8) || Rivera (21) || 54,234 || 41–35 
|- align="center" bgcolor="ffbbbb"
| 77 || June 24 || @ Pirates || 12–5 || Gorzelanny (6–6) || Rasner (4–5) |||| 38,867 || 41-36
|- align="center" bgcolor="bbffbb"
| 78 || June 25 || @ Pirates || 10–0 || Chamberlain (2–2) || Duke (4–5) || || 38,952 || 42–36
|- align="center" bgcolor="bbbbbb"
| — || June 26 || @ Pirates ||colspan=6|Postponed (rain) Rescheduled for July 10
|-align="center" bgcolor="ffbbbb"
| 79 || June 27 || Mets || 15–6 || Pelfrey (5–6) || Giese (1–3) || || 54,978 || 42–37
|- align="center" bgcolor="bbffbb"
| 80 || June 27 || @ Mets || 9–0 || Ponson (5–1) || Martínez (2–2)|| || 56,308 || 43–37
|- align="center" bgcolor="bbffbb"
| 81 || June 28 || @ Mets || 3–2 || Pettitte (9–5) || Santana (7–7) || Rivera (22) || 56,172 || 44–37
|- align="center" bgcolor="ffbbbb"
| 82 || June 29 || @ Mets || 3–1 || Pérez (6–5) || Rasner (4–6) || Wagner (18) || 56,277 || 44–38
|- align="center" bgcolor="ffbbbb"
| 83 || June 30 || Rangers || 2–1 || Feldman (2–3) || Mussina (10–6) || Wilson (18) || 53,045 || 44–39
|-

|- align="center" bgcolor="ffbbbb"
| 84 || July 1 || Rangers || 3–2 || Francisco (2–2) || Rivera (2–3) || Wilson (19) || 53,223 || 44–40
|- align="center" bgcolor="bbffbb"
| 85 || July 2 || Rangers || 18–7 || Ramírez (2–0)|| Madrigal (0–1) || || 52,659 || 45–40
|- align="center" bgcolor="ffbbbb"
| 86 || July 3 || Red Sox || 7–0 || Lester (7–3) || Pettitte (9–6) || || 54,677 || 45–41
|- align="center" bgcolor="ffbbbb"
| 87 || July 4 || Red Sox ||6–4 ||Beckett (8–5) ||Rasner (4–7) || ||55,130 ||45–42
|- align="center" bgcolor="bbffbb"
| 88 || July 5 || Red Sox || 2–1 || Mussina (11–6) || Masterson (4–3) || Rivera (23) || 54,920 || 46–42
|- align="center" bgcolor="bbffbb"
| 89 || July 6 || Red Sox || 5–4 (10) || Rivera (3–3) || Papelbon (3–3)|| || 54,922 || 47–42
|- align="center" bgcolor="bbffbb"
| 90 || July 8 || Rays || 5–0 || Pettitte (10–6) || Kazmir (7–4) || || 53,089 || 48–42
|- align="center" bgcolor="bbffbb"
| 91 || July 9 || Rays || 2–1 (10) || Rivera (4–3) || Balfour (2–1) || || 53,552 || 49–42
|- align="center" bgcolor="ffbbbb" 
| 92 || July 10 || @ Pirates || 4–2 || Maholm (6–5) || Veras (2–1) || Marte (4) || 39,081 || 49–43
|- align="center" bgcolor="ffbbbb"
| 93 || July 11 || @ Blue Jays || 5–0 || Halladay (11–6) || Chamberlain (2–3) || || 43,078 || 49–44 
|- align="center" bgcolor="bbffbb"
| 94 || July 12 || @ Blue Jays || 9–4 || Rasner (5–7) || Litsch (8–6) || || 44,364 || 50–44
|- align="center" bgcolor="ffbbbb"
| 95 || July 13 || @ Blue Jays || 4–1 || Burnett (10–8) || Pettitte (10–7) || Ryan (18) || 43,854 || 50–45
|- align="center" bgcolor="bbffbb"
| 96 || July 18 || Athletics || 7–1 || Mussina (12–6) || Smith (5–8) || || 54,145 || 51–45
|- align="center" bgcolor="bbffbb"
| 97 || July 19 || Athletics || 4–3 (12)|| Robertson (1–0) || DiNardo (1–2) || || 54,183 || 52–45
|- align="center" bgcolor="bbffbb"
| 98 || July 20 || Athletics || 2–1 || Pettitte (11–7) || Duchscherer (10–6) || Rivera (24) || 54,366 || 53–45
|- align="center" bgcolor="bbffbb"
| 99 || July 21 || Twins || 12–4 || Ponson (6–1) || Blackburn (7–6) || || 53,484 || 54–45
|- align="center" bgcolor="bbffbb"
| 100 || July 22 || Twins || 8–2 || Robertson (2–0) || Slowey (6–7) || || 53,406 || 55–45
|- align="center" bgcolor="bbffbb"
| 101 || July 23 || Twins || 5–1 || Mussina (13–6) || Perkins (7–3) || Rivera (25) || 54,114 || 56–45
|- align="center" bgcolor="bbffbb"
| 102 || July 25 || @ Red Sox || 1–0 || Chamberlain (3–3) || Beckett (9–7) || Rivera (26) || 37,744 || 57–45
|- align="center" bgcolor="bbffbb"
| 103 || July 26 || @ Red Sox || 10–3 || Pettitte (12–7) || Wakefield (6–8) || || 37,225 || 58–45
|- align="center" bgcolor="ffbbbb"
| 104 || July 27 || @ Red Sox || 9–2 || Lester (9–3)|| Ponson (6–2) || || 37,688 || 58–46
|- align="center" bgcolor="ffbbbb"
| 105 || July 28 || Orioles || 13–4 || Guthrie (7–8) || Mussina (13–7) || || 54,120 || 58–47
|- align="center" bgcolor="ffbbbb"
| 106 || July 29 || Orioles || 7–6 || Cabrera (7–6) || Rasner (5–8) || || 54,241 || 58–48
|- align="center" bgcolor="bbffbb"
| 107 || July 30 || Orioles || 13–3 || Chamberlain (4–3) || Sarfate (4–2) || || 54,296 || 59–48
|- align="center" bgcolor="ffbbbb"
| 108 || July 31 || Angels || 12–6 || Garland (10–6) || Pettitte (12–8) || || 53,405 || 59–49
|-

|- align="center" bgcolor="ffbbbb"
| 109 || August 1 || Angels || 1–0 || Santana (12–5) || Rivera (4–4) || Rodríguez (45) || 53,997 || 59–50
|- align="center" bgcolor="bbffbb"
| 110 || August 2 || Angels || 8–2 || Mussina (14–7) || Weaver (9–9) || || 54,170 || 60–50
|- align="center" bgcolor="bbffbb"
| 111 || August 3 || Angels || 14–9 || Ramírez (3–0) || Shields (4–3) || || 54,204 || 61–50
|- align="center" bgcolor="ffbbbb"
| 112 || August 4 || @ Rangers || 9–5 || Guardado (3–2) || Marte (4–1) || || 33,813 || 61–51
|- align="center" bgcolor="ffbbbb"
| 113 || August 5 || @ Rangers || 8–6 || Harrison (3–2) || Pettitte (12–9) || Guardado (3) || 34,473 || 61–52
|- align="center" bgcolor="bbffbb"
| 114 || August 6 || @ Rangers || 5–3 || Ponson (7–2) || Hunter (0–1) || Rivera (27) || 38,638 || 62–52
|- align="center" bgcolor="bbffbb"
| 115 || August 7 || @ Rangers || 3–0 || Mussina (15–7) || Feldman (4–5) || Rivera (28) || 44,603 || 63–52
|- align="center" bgcolor="ffbbbb"
| 116 || August 8 || @ Angels || 10–5 || Weaver (10–9) || Kennedy (0–4) || || 44,158 || 63–53
|- align="center" bgcolor="ffbbbb"
| 117 || August 9 || @ Angels || 11–4 || Shields (5–3) || Ramírez (3–1) || || 43,919 || 63–54
|- align="center" bgcolor="ffbbbb"
| 118 || August 10 || @ Angels || 4–3 || Rodríguez (2–2) || Marte (4–2) || || 44,138 || 63–55
|- align="center" bgcolor="ffbbbb"
| 119 || August 11 || @ Twins || 4–0 || Perkins (9–3) || Ponson (7–3) || || 30,126 || 63–56
|- align="center" bgcolor="bbffbb"
| 120 || August 12 || @ Twins || 9–6 (12) || Veras (3–1) || Guerrier (6–6) || Ramírez (1) || 33,036 || 64–56
|- align="center" bgcolor="ffbbbb"
| 121 || August 13 || @ Twins || 4–2 || Slowey (9–8) || Rasner (5–9) || Nathan (32) || 35,187 || 64–57
|- align="center" bgcolor="ffbbbb"
| 122 || August 15 || Royals || 4–3 || Núñez (4–1) || Rivera (4–5) || Soria (33) || 53,067 || 64–58
|- align="center" bgcolor="bbffbb"
| 123 || August 16 || Royals || 3–2 (13) || Robertson (3–0) || Fulchino (0–1) || || 54,180 || 65–58
|- align="center" bgcolor="bbffbb"
| 124 || August 17 || Royals || 15–6 || Mussina (16–7) || Bannister (7–12) || || 54,114 || 66–58
|- align="center" bgcolor="ffbbbb"
| 125 || August 19 || @ Blue Jays || 2–1 || Burnett (16–9) || Veras (3–2) || Ryan (24) || 37,221 || 66–59
|- align="center" bgcolor="bbffbb"
| 126 || August 20 || @ Blue Jays || 5–1 || Pettitte (13–9) || Purcey (2–4) || || 34,910 || 67–59
|- align="center" bgcolor="ffbbbb"
| 127 || August 21 || @ Blue Jays || 14–3 || Halladay (15–9) || Ponson (7–4) || || 37,037 || 67–60
|- align="center" bgcolor="bbffbb"
| 128 || August 22 || @ Orioles || 9–4 || Veras (4–2) || Walker (1–1) || Rivera (29) || 45,543 || 68–60
|- align="center" bgcolor="bbffbb"
| 129 || August 23 || @ Orioles || 5–3 || Pavano (1–0) || Guthrie (10–10) || Rivera (30) || 48,817 || 69–60
|- align="center" bgcolor="bbffbb"
| 130 || August 24 || @ Orioles || 8–7 || Ramírez (4–1) || Walker (1–2) || Rivera (31) || 42,746 || 70–60
|- align="center" bgcolor="ffbbbb"
| 131 || August 26 || Red Sox || 7–3 || Wakefield (8–8) || Pettitte (13–10) || Papelbon (34) || 55,058 || 70–61
|- align="center" bgcolor="ffbbbb"
| 132 || August 27 || Red Sox || 11–3 || Byrd (9–11) || Ponson (7–5) || || 55,027 || 70–62
|- align="center" bgcolor="bbffbb"
| 133 || August 28 || Red Sox || 3–2 || Rivera (5–5) || Masterson (4–4) || || 55,092 || 71–62
|- align="center" bgcolor="bbffbb"
| 134 || August 29 || Blue Jays || 2–1 || Pavano (2-0) || Burnett (16–10) || Rivera (32) || 53,088 || 72–62
|- align="center" bgcolor="ffbbbb"
| 135 || August 30 || Blue Jays || 7–6 || League (1–2) || Marte (4–3) || Ryan (25) || 53,273 || 72–63
|- align="center" bgcolor="ffbbbb"
| 136 || August 31 || Blue Jays || 6–2 || Halladay (17–9) || Pettitte (13–11) || || 53,634 || 72–64
|-

|- align="center" bgcolor="bbffbb"
| 137 || September 1 || @ Tigers || 13-9 || Bruney (2-0) || Verlander (10-15) || || 44,336 || 73-64
|- align="center" bgcolor="bbffbb"
| 138 || September 2 || @ Rays || 7-2 || Mussina (17-7) || Garza (11-8) || || 21,629 || 74-64
|- align="center" bgcolor="bbffbb"
| 139 || September 3 || @ Rays || 8-4 || Ramírez (5-1) || Jackson (11-9) || || 25,215 || 75-64
|- align="center" bgcolor="ffbbbb"
| 140 || September 4 || @ Rays || 7-5 || Kazmir (11-6) || Rasner (5-10) || Wheeler (10) || 26,080 || 75-65
|- align="center" bgcolor="ffbbbb"
| 141 || September 5 || @ Mariners || 3-1 || Morrow (2-2) || Pettitte (13-12) || Putz (11) || 39,518 || 75-66
|- align="center" bgcolor="bbffbb"
| 142 || September 6 || @ Mariners || 7-4 || Ponson (8-5) || Green (4-5) || Rivera (33) || 44,473 || 76-66
|- align="center" bgcolor="ffbbbb"
| 143 || September 7 || @ Mariners || 5-2 || Feierabend (1-2) || Mussina (17-8) || Putz (12) || 42,677 || 76-67
|- align="center" bgcolor="ffbbbb"
| 144 || September 8 || @ Angels || 12-1 || Garland (13-8) || Pavano (2-1) || || 41,025 || 76-68
|- align="center" bgcolor="bbffbb"
| 145 || September 9 || @ Angels || 7-1 || Aceves (1-0) || Santana (15-6) || || 43,042 || 77-68
|- align="center" bgcolor="ffbbbb"
| 146 || September 10 || @ Angels || 4-2 || Moseley (2-4) || Pettitte (13-13) || Rodríguez (56) || 39,783 || 77-69
|- align="center" bgcolor="#bbbbbb"
| -- || September 12 || Rays || colspan=6|Postponed (rain) Rescheduled for September 13
|- align="center" bgcolor="ffbbbb"
| 147 || September 13 || Rays || 7-1 || Shields (13-8) || Mussina (17-9) || || 54,088 || 77-70
|- align="center" bgcolor="bbffbb"
| 148 || September 13 || Rays || 6-5 || Marte (5-3) || Howell (6-1) || Rivera (34) || 53,568 || 78-70
|- align="center" bgcolor="bbffbb"
| 149 || September 14 || Rays || 8-4 || Pavano (3-1) || Jackson (11-11) || Rivera (35) || 54,279 || 79-70
|- align="center" bgcolor="bbffbb"
| 150 || September 15 || White Sox || 4-2 || Coke (1-0) || Wassermann (1-2) || Rivera (36) || 53,236 || 80-70
|- align="center" bgcolor="ffbbbb"
| 151 || September 16 || White Sox || 6-2 || Floyd (16-7) || Pettitte (13-14) || || 52,558 || 80-71
|- align="center" bgcolor="bbffbb"
| 152 || September 17 || White Sox || 5-1 || Bruney (3-0) || Richard (2-5) || || 52,671 || 81-71
|- align="center" bgcolor="bbffbb"
| 153 || September 18 || White Sox || 9-2 || Mussina (18-9) || Vázquez (12-14) || || 53,152 || 82-71
|- align="center" bgcolor="bbffbb"
| 154 || September 19 || Orioles || 3-2 || Pavano (4-1) || Liz (6-6) || Rivera (37) || 54,136 || 83-71
|- align="center" bgcolor="bbffbb"
| 155 || September 20 || Orioles || 1-0 || Rivera (6-5) || Miller (0-2) || || 54,662 || 84-71
|- align="center" bgcolor="bbffbb"
| 156 || September 21 || Orioles || 7-3 || Pettitte (14-14) || Waters (3-4) || || 54,610 || 85-71
|- align="center" bgcolor="bbffbb"
| 157 || September 23 || @ Blue Jays || 3-1 || Mussina (19-9) || Litsch (12-9) || Rivera (38) || 27,216 || 86-71
|- align="center" bgcolor="bbffbb"
| 158 || September 24 || @ Blue Jays || 6-2 (10) || Veras (5-2) || Carlson (7-2) || || 28,701 || 87-71
|- align="center" bgcolor="ffbbbb"
| 159 || September 25 || @ Blue Jays || 8-2 || Halladay (20-11) || Pavano (4-2) || || 44,346 || 87-72
|- align="center" bgcolor="bbffbb"
| 160 || September 26 || @ Red Sox || 19-8 || Robertson (4-0) || Pauley (0-1) || || 37,301 || 88-72
|- align="center" bgcolor="bbbbbb"
| -- || September 27 || @ Red Sox ||colspan=6|Postponed (rain) Rescheduled for September 28
|- align="center" bgcolor="bbffbb"
| 161 || September 28 || @ Red Sox || 6-2 || Mussina (20-9) || Matsuzaka (18-3) || Rivera (39) || 37,091 || 89-72
|- align="center" bgcolor="ffbbbb"
| 162 || September 28 || @ Red Sox || 4-3 (10) || Hansack (1-0) || Veras (5-3) || || 37,440 || 89-73
|-

Player stats
Bold= Team leader in category.

Batting
Note: G = Games played; AB = At Bats; R = Runs scored; H = Hits; 2B = Doubles; 3B = Triples; HR = Home runs; RBI = Runs batted in; AVG = Batting average; SB = Stolen bases

Bold indicates team leader

Pitching
Note: W = Wins; L = Losses; ERA = Earned run average; G = Games pitched; GS = Games started; SV = Saves; IP = Innings pitched; R = Runs allowed; ER = Earned runs allowed; BB = Walks allowed; K = Strikeouts

Bold indicates team leader for W, L, ERA, G, GS, SV, and IP; indicates highest on team in R, ER, BB, and K

Farm system

LEAGUE CHAMPIONS: Scranton/Wilkes-Barre, Trenton

References

Game Logs:
Official Game Log (YES Network).
1st Half: New York Yankees Game Log on ESPN.com
2nd Half: New York Yankees Game Log on ESPN.com
Batting Statistics: New York Yankees Batting Stats on ESPN.com
Pitching Statistics: New York Yankees Pitching Stats on ESPN.com

2008 New York Yankees season at Baseball Reference
2008 New York Yankees team page at www.baseball-almanac.com

New York Yankees seasons
New York Yankees
New York Yankees
2000s in the Bronx